is an autobahn in Bremen in northwestern Germany. The first part was opened in 1995, parts near the Bremen Airport are currently under construction. A second Weser tunnel will be part of the project, presumably being financed as a toll road and built by a private contractor.

Exit list 

|-
|colspan="3"|

 
|-
|colspan="3"|

|}

External links 

281
A281
Proposed roads in Germany